Moravec may refer to:

Places in the Czech Republic
Moravec (Žďár nad Sázavou District), a municipality and village in the Vysočina Region
Moraveč, a municipality and village in the Vysočina Region
Moraveč, a village and part of Chotoviny in the South Bohemian Region
Moraveč, a village and part of Slapsko in the South Bohemian Region

People
Moravec (surname), people with the surname Moravec

Other
Moravec (robot), a class of robots in the novel Ilium
Moravec corner detection algorithm
Moravec's paradox

See also